is a Japanese manga artist. He graduated from Musashino Art University. He is most known for his science-fiction series Eden: It's an Endless World!, which has been translated into English by Dark Horse.

Manga works

Serialized works
Eden: It's an Endless World! (1997–2008)
 (2002 Serialization suspended)
 (2006  Vol.1-Serialization interrupted)
 (2008–2016)
 (2016–2019)
Planet of the Fools (2019-2022)

Short story collections
Hiroki Endo's Tanpenshu  Volume 1 (1996–1997)
"The Crows, the Girl and the Yakuza"
"Because You're Definitely a Cute Girl"
"For Those of Us Who Don't Believe in God"
Hiroki Endo's Tanpenshu Volume 2 (1996–2000)
"Hang"
"High School Girl 2000"
"Platform"
"Boys Don't Cry"

References

External links
 Hiroki Endo manga works at Media Arts Database 
  
 Uno sguardo alla fine del mondo di D. Santoni, in  IntercoM

1970 births
Living people
Manga artists from Akita Prefecture
People from Akita (city)